Cethosia hypsea hypsina, the Malay lacewing, is a subspecies of Cethosia hypsea, a butterfly of the genus Cethosia belonging to the family Nymphalidae.

Description
The wingspan is about 80 mm. The uppersides of the forewings are black with a broad white transverse band and an orange-red basal area. In the female on each upperside forewing the basal orange area has also a white patch. In both sexes the outer margins of both wings have scalloped black margins.

The undersides of the wings are orange red with large white bands and several black or pale blue stripes. The edges of the undersides of the wings are deeply scalloped by white markings.

The larvae mainly feed on Adenia macrophylla var. singaporeana (Passifloraceae). The caterpillars are wine red and have long spines. They are also poisonous.

Distribution
This butterfly is present from southern Burma to Singapore.

Habitat
Cethosia hypsea hypsina can be found in forested areas and in nature reserves.

References

 A.S. Corbet and H.M. Pendlebury - The Butterflies of The Malay Peninsula, Malayan Nature Society. 
 M. Bascombe, G. Johnston, F. Bascombe - The Butterflies of Hong Kong, Princeton University Press. 1999
 Malay Lacewing

External links
 Raja-Kupu Kupu
 Trek Nature
 Butterfly Interest Group

Acraeini
Butterfly subspecies